Bernt B. Haugan (September 17, 1862 – December 5, 1931) was an American Lutheran minister, politician, and temperance leader.

Biography
Bernt Benjaminsen Haugan was born at Haugan Vestre in Skogn parish in Levanger municipality  in Nord-Trøndelag county, Norway, on September 17, 1862.  He and his parents and siblings left for America on April 3, 1872. He attended Red Wing Seminary in Red Wing, Minnesota, the educational center and preparatory school of the Hauge Synod of the Evangelical Lutheran Church in America.

Haugan was ordained a Lutheran minister and served out his pastorate within the Hauge Synod. Members of the Hauge Synod were a group of Norwegian-American Lutherans who followed the principles of revivalist Norwegian lay preacher Hans Nielsen Hauge.

In 1900, Haugan ran for the office of Governor of Minnesota as a candidate for the Prohibition Party. From 1904 to 1907, Haugan was co-owner and publisher of the Norwegian language newspaper Vot tid which was published in Minneapolis.

Haugan  wrote and published several Norwegian language prayer books. His most notable work was a hymnal entitled Vaegterrøsten. Musik til Sange i Vaeteren og andre gode Sange published in Chicago during 1887. Haugan also compiled  Folkesange - Songs for All Occasions- Religious Patriotic and Lyric, a compilation of  English-language and Norwegian-language songs of religion, patriotic, and popular folksongs of the era. Additionally Haugan published a volume of temperance songs in a book entitled Kamp melodier ('Battle Melodies').

Haugan died on December 5, 1931, and was buried at Valley View Cemetery in Everett, Washington.

Selected works
Et Beføg hos Presten ("A Visit to the Minister". Faribault, Minn: O.A. Östby. 1895)
Over land og Bolge, Reiseskildringer fra Orienten og de Europeiske lande  ("Over Land and Billow: Travel Narratives from the Orient and Europe". Minneapolis, Minn: Ungdommens Ven. 1897)
De Syv Djævle  ("The Seven Demons". Chicago, Illinois: Fremad. 1901)

References

External links
Norwegian Lutheran Pastors of America, 1843-1927
Norwegian-American Historical Association
The Promise of America
 Political Graveyard

1852 births
1931 deaths
People from Levanger
Norwegian emigrants to the United States
20th-century American Lutheran clergy
American Protestant hymnwriters
American temperance activists
Lutheran sermon writers
American Lutheran hymnwriters
Norwegian Lutheran hymnwriters
Minnesota Prohibitionists
Burials in Washington (state)
19th-century American Lutheran clergy